The 1938 Wichita Shockers football team was an American football team that represented Wichita University (now known as Wichita State University) as a member of the Central Intercollegiate Conference (CIC) during the 1938 college football season. In its ninth season under head coach Al Gebert, the team compiled a 7–2–1 record.

Schedule

References

Wichita
Wichita State Shockers football seasons
Wichita Football